Rasiei is a village which is the administrative centre of the district of Rasiey, in Wondama Bay Regency of West Papua province of Indonesia.

Climate
Rasiei has a tropical rainforest climate (Af) with heavy rainfall year-round.

References

Notes
 About Rasiei

Populated places in West Papua
Regency seats of West Papua (province)